The Southern Legal Resource Center, Inc. (SLRC) is a South Carolina non-profit public law corporation which offers legal support to defend what they see as First Amendment violations, violation of civil rights, or “discrimination against advocates of southern heritage”.

History
The SLRC was founded in 1995 by a group of four attorneys: Carl A. Barrington (deceased), Kirk David Lyons, Larry Norman, and Lourie A. Salley III. Lyons was appointed Chief Trial Counsel, a position he still holds, and Salley became the firm's first board chairman. The organization is a registered South Carolina corporation with its executive offices in Black Mountain, North Carolina.

In 1996, the SLRC successfully defended the "Blacksburg (SC) 7" and in 1999 sued a Greenville, South Carolina, private academy on behalf of Dr. Winston McCuen, a teacher at the school who had been fired for refusing to remove a Confederate flag that was part of a classroom historical display, and for refusing to salute the US in protest.

In 2004 the SLRC hired advertising executive and Southern activist Roger McCredie as its full-time executive director. Under McCredie the organization doubled the size of its board of directors, increased its advertising program and undertook an ambitious five-year growth and development plan.

SLRC advocacy

The SLRC, was the first law firm to promote a legal theory developed by Lyons that combined First Amendment protection with an interpretation of the "National Origin" provision of the Civil Rights Act of 1964 that would afford federal legal protection for what Lyons termed "Confederate Southern Americans." Using this interpretation of Civil Rights law, the SLRC undertook cases on behalf of Federal Aviation Administration workers in Florida, utility company employees in South Carolina, workers at a DuPont plant in Virginia (the "DuPont Seven"), and Cherokee students in Alabama. Federal judges have shown almost universal hostility to legal protection for "Confederate Southern Americans," but Lyons and the SLRC still advocate for clients claiming an increase in the number of job-related persecution of "Confederate Southern Americans" and a paucity of legal protection in the workplace save for cases that come under the Civil Rights Act of 1964. Lyons has noted that "Republican judges are adamantly opposed to any extension of the Civil Rights Act of 1964 and Democratic Judges are hostile to almost all things Confederate."

The SLRC has supported the rights of students to use and display Confederate symbols. Its most significant victory was Castorina v. Madison County Schools, in which the United States Court of Appeals for the Sixth Circuit in 2001 overturned a federal district court's ruling in favor of a Kentucky school board's ban on student displays of Confederate symbols, and remanded the case for further proceedings. In 2006 the Castorina decision led to an out-of-court award of damages for Jacqueline Duty, an SLRC client who had sued her own school board after she was barred from attending her high school prom in a Confederate flag-patterned evening gown.

Criticism
The SLRC has drawn fire from the Southern Poverty Law Center (SPLC), which has frequently attacked the SLRC by citing Lyons' pre-SLRC defense of some controversial right-wing figures such as Aryan Nations members, White Aryan Resistance founder Tom Metzger and Lyons' 1990 marriage to the sister of jailed Order defendant David Tate. The SPLC also criticized Lyons tie to Deborah Davila's FBI espionage case.

In addition the SPLC has called Southern Legal's fundraising practices "deceitful" citing, for example, "the SLRC Web site detailed two disputes under a headline that read 'Cases Pending,' implying that the SLRC represented the parties involved. In both cases, the plaintiff's families say Lyons actually did very little for them."

In 1997 Kirk Lyons and SLRC director Neill Payne befriended Asheville NAACP president H. K. Edgerton. In response, the NAACP deprived Edgerton of his presidency. Edgerton became a "born-again Confederate" and for a time served as an SLRC director and chairman of the SLRC's board of advisors.

"Confederate Southern Americans"

The SLRC has called on "Confederate Southern Americans" to identify as a separate race on the 2010 United States Census form.

References

External links
Official website
"In the Lyons Den: Despite his extremism, Kirk Lyons, a white supremacist lawyer whose clients have been a 'Who's Who' of the radical right, is becoming the attorney for the neo-Confederate movement", SPLC, Summer 2000
"Cashing in on the Confederacy: A North Carolina legal group calls itself the leading advocate for 'Confederate Americans.' Its dismal record suggests otherwise" by Heidi Beirich and Mark Potok, SPLC, Spring 2003
Kentucky Division SCV webpage on Confederate Gown lawsuit (with photographs)

Culture of the Southern United States
Politics of the Southern United States
Legal advocacy organizations in the United States
Anti-discrimination law in the United States
Foundations based in the United States
Discrimination in the United States
Heritage organizations
Neo-Confederate organizations